Lithium is an inactive village located in Perry County, Missouri, United States. The population was 92 at the 2020 census. The 2000 Census found Lithium to have zero residents; an Associated Press article, however, stated that about 50 people in fact resided there, but may have been counted as part of Perry County's rural population.

Lithium had a ZIP Code of 63775, but it has since been declared by the USPS to be "Not Acceptable - Use Perryville."

Etymology
Lithium's location is due to two natural mineral springs; one of the two springs contained lithium salts, giving the town its name.

History
Lithium was first surveyed as a town in 1882.  The first settlers were Dr. Henry Clay Fish, Richard P. Dobbs and James G. Christian, who all came to Missouri from Illinois. The town was incorporated in 1883 and the first mayor was Richard C. Lisenby. The location of the town was determined by two mineral springs, which were highly prized on account of their medicinal qualities, which led to the construction of a bath house by Thomas King in 1883. A Baptist church, Lithium Baptist, was organized in 1885 and a Catholic church, St. John the Evangelist, was organized in 1896. By 1912 the town had two general stores, two mills, a brick yard and population of 98.

Geography 

Location of nearby communities

Demographics 

As of the census of 2000, there were no people living in the village.

2010 census
As of the census of 2010, there were 89 people, 28 households, and 22 families residing in the village. The racial makeup of the village was 98.88% White and 1.12% from other races. Hispanic or Latino of any race were 1.12% of the population.

There were 28 households, of which 53.6% had children under the age of 18 living with them, 64.3% were married couples living together, 7.1% had a female householder with no husband present, 7.1% had a male householder with no wife present, and 21.4% were non-families. 7.1% of all households were made up of individuals, and 3.6% had someone living alone who was 65 years of age or older. The average household size was 3.18 and the average family size was 3.27.

The median age in the village was 27.5 years. 34.8% of residents were under the age of 18; 9% were between the ages of 18 and 24; 25.7% were from 25 to 44; 20.2% were from 45 to 64; and 10.1% were 65 years of age or older. The gender makeup of the village was 57.3% male and 42.7% female.

Gallery

References

 
Villages in Perry County, Missouri
Villages in Missouri
Populated places disestablished in 1986